Pietro Francesco Caccialupi (Pizzighettone, 1735 – April 19, 1814) was an Italian painter.

He moved to Cremona as a boy, and trained under Giacomo Guerrini. He worked as a restorer, including of the "Multiplication of the Loaves" by Francesco Boccaccino in the refectory of the church of Sant'Abbondio of the Theatines. The painting was then transferred to the presbytery of Sant'Agata in Cremona.

References
Citations

Bibliography

18th-century Italian painters
Italian male painters
19th-century Italian painters
Painters from Cremona
1735 births
1814 deaths
19th-century Italian male artists
18th-century Italian male artists